The Europe/Africa Zone was one of the three zones of the regional Davis Cup competition in 2016.

In the Europe/Africa Zone there were three different tiers, called groups, in which teams competed against each other to advance to the upper tier. Winners in Group II advanced to the Europe/Africa Zone Group I. Teams who lost their respective ties competed in the relegation play-offs, with winning teams remaining in Group II, whereas European and African teams who lost their play-offs were relegated respectively to the Europe and Africa Zone Group III in 2017.

Participating nations

Seeds: 
 
 
 
 
 
 
 
 

Remaining nations:

Draw

 and  promoted to Group I in 2017.

First round

Lithuania vs. Norway

South Africa vs. Luxembourg

Turkey vs. Bulgaria

Bosnia and Herzegovina vs. Tunisia

Latvia vs. Monaco

Egypt vs. Belarus

Finland vs. Zimbabwe

Georgia vs. Denmark

Second round

Lithuania vs. South Africa

Bosnia and Herzegovina vs. Turkey

Belarus vs. Latvia

Denmark vs. Finland

Play-offs

Luxembourg vs. Norway

Tunisia vs. Bulgaria

Monaco vs. Egypt

Georgia vs. Zimbabwe

Third round

Lithuania vs. Bosnia and Herzegovina

Belarus vs. Denmark

References

External links
Official Website

Europe/Africa Zone Group II
Davis Cup Europe/Africa Zone